

pro
Pro-Banthine

proa-prob
' (INN)Proamatine Probalan Probampacin probarbital sodium (INN)Proben-C probenecid (INN)probucol (INN)
proc-prodprocainamide (INN)procaine (INN)Procalamine Procan Procanbid Procapan procarbazine (INN)Procardia procaterol (INN)prochlorperazine (INN)procinolol (INN)procinonide (INN)proclonol (INN)procodazole (INN)Proctocort Proctofoam HC procyclidine (INN)procymate (INN)prodeconium bromide (INN)prodilidine (INN)prodipine (INN)prodolic acid (INN)

prof-prokprofadol (INN)Profen Profenal profenamine (INN)Proferdex profexalone (INN)proflavine (INN)proflazepam (INN)Profloxin (Hexal Australia) [Au]. Redirects to ciprofloxacin.progabide (INN)Progestasert progesterone (INN)proglumetacin (INN)proglumide (INN)Proglycem Prograf proguanil (INN)proguanil hydrochloride (USAN)Prohance proheptazine (INN)Proketazine Prokine (Immunex Corp)Proklar 
prol-pronProleukin (Chiron)proligestone (INN)proline (INN)prolintane (INN)ProlixinProloidprolonium iodide (INN)ProloprimPromactaPromaparpromazine (INN)promegestone (INN)promelase (INN)promestriene (INN)PromethPromethaconpromethazine teoclate (INN)promethazine (INN)PrometheganPrometriumpromolate (INN)promoxolane (INN)Pronestylpronetalol (INN)

prop
propa-prophPropacet 100 propacetamol (INN)propafenone (INN)propagermanium pumaprazole (INN)propamidine (INN)propd (INN)propanocaine (INN)propantheline bromide (INN)propatylnitrate' (INN)lamide]] (INN)Propecia propenidazole (INN)proylline (INN)properidine (INN)propetamide (INN)propetandrol (INN)Prophene 65propi-propupropicillin (INN)propikacin (INN)Propine propinetidine (INN)propiolactone (INN)propiomazine (INN)propipocaine (INN)propiram (INN)propisergide (INN)propiverine (INN)propizepine (INN)propofol (INN)propoxate (INN)propoxycaine (INN)Propoxyphene Compound 65 propranolol (INN)Propulsid 
propypropyl docetrizoate (INN)propylhexedrine (INN)propyliodone (INN)propylthiouracil (INN)propyperone (INN)propyphenazone (INN)propyromazine bromide (INN)
proq-prosproquazone (INN)proquinolate (INN)prorenoate potassium (INN)proroxan (INN)Proscar proscillaridin (INN)Prosol Prosom prospidium chloride (INN)prostalene (INN)Prostaphlin ProstascintProstep Prostin E2 Prostin F2 Alpha Prostin VR Pediatric prosulpride (INN)prosultiamine (INN)
prot-provprotamine zinc insulin injection (INN)proterguride (INN)protheobromine (INN)prothipendyl (INN)prothixene (INN)protiofate (INN)protionamide (INN)protirelin (INN)protizinic acid (INN)protokylol (INN)Protonix Protopam Chloride (2-PAM)Protopic Protostat protriptyline (INN)Protropin Proval #3 Proventil Provera Provigil Provocholineprox-prozproxazole (INN)proxibarbal (INN)proxibutene (INN)proxicromil (INN)proxifezone (INN)proxorphan (INN)proxymetacaine (INN)proxyphylline (INN)Prozac prozapine (INN)

pruprucalopride (INN)prulifloxacin (INN)prussian blue insoluble (USAN)pruvanserin''' (USAN)